The British singer and songwriter Shara Nelson made three studio albums and 19 singles between 1983 and 2008, in addition to compilations, videos, EPs and other works.

Studio albums

Compilations

Extended plays

Singles

Other appearances

Videos

Music videos

See also
Massive Attack discography

References

Discographies of British artists